Rollo H. Bergeson (February 23, 1911 – April 6, 1993) was an American attorney and government official who served as the 22nd secretary of state of Iowa from 1947 to 1949.

Early life and education 
Bergeson was born in Sioux City, Iowa. His grandfather, Lars Uhr Bergeson, immigrated to the United States from Norway and later became a co-founder of the Republican Party of Iowa. Bergenson had seven siblings, including Emlin L. Bergeson, who served as a member of the Iowa House of Representatives. Bergenson earned a Bachelor of Arts degree from the University of South Dakota in 1932 and a Bachelor of Laws from the Drake University Law School in 1935.

Career 
After graduating from law school, Bergeson practiced law in Sioux City from 1935 to 1939. He later enlisted in the United States Navy at the start of World War II. During the war, Bergeson attended the U.S. Army School of Military Government at the University of Virginia and the Civil Affairs Training School at Stanford University. He was also assigned to the Naval Air Transport Service. After the war, Bergeson served as the 22nd secretary of state of Iowa from 1947 to 1949.

Personal life 
Bergeson and his wife, Mary Cremin, had two children. He died in Nevada, Iowa in 1993.

References 

1911 births
1993 deaths
People from Sioux City, Iowa
Politicians from Sioux City, Iowa
University of South Dakota alumni
Iowa lawyers
Secretaries of State of Iowa
People from Nevada, Iowa
Iowa Republicans
Drake University Law School alumni